Chris Flynn is an Australian author, editor and critic.

Bibliography
Flynn's first novel, A Tiger in Eden was released in Australia by Text Publishing in March 2012. It was shortlisted for the 2013 Commonwealth Book Prize. His second novel, The Glass Kingdom  was released in May 2014 and his third, Mammoth, was published in March 2020.

McSweeney's issue 41, released July 2012, features a portfolio of fiction by Indigenous Australian writers, Terra Australis: Four Stories from Aboriginal Australian Writers, curated, edited and introduced by Flynn.

Flynn contributed to a regular column, Odd Jobs, on The Paris Review Daily, the blog page of The Paris Review. He has written for the Griffith Review, The Age, The Australian, The Books and Arts Daily Show on ABC Radio National, Meanjin, The Big Issue Australia and many other publications.

Mammoth was shortlisted for the Fiction prize at the 2021 Indie Book Awards.

Works

Novels
A Tiger in Eden
The Glass Kingdom
Mammoth

Book reviews

Review of:

Personal life 
Born in Belfast, Northern Ireland, Flynn has resided in Melbourne, Australia since 1999.

References

1972 births
Living people
Writers from Belfast
Northern Ireland emigrants to Australia
Writers from Melbourne
Australian literary critics